Serge David (31 August 1932 – 13 April 1991) was a French racing cyclist. He rode in the 1958 Tour de France.

References

1932 births
1991 deaths
French male cyclists
Place of birth missing